Lee Seol (born Kang Min-jung; April 13, 1993) is a South Korean actress. She is best known for her role in the television series Less Than Evil (2018–2019), which earned her a Baeksang Arts Award nomination.

Career
Lee Seol made her acting debut in 2018 in the films Herstory, a cameo in I Have a Date with Spring and a short film, A Room of One's Own. She also made several television series appearance, such as After The Rain and MBC's Less Than Evil.

In February 2022 Lee signed exclusive contract with Just Entertainment, after the contract with her former agency expired.

Filmography

Film

Television series

Web series

Theater

Awards and nominations

References

External links
 
 
 

1993 births
Living people
South Korean film actresses
South Korean television actresses
South Korean web series actresses
21st-century South Korean actresses
People from North Gyeongsang Province
Sungshin Women's University alumni